The year of 1942 in film involved some significant events, in particular the release of a film consistently rated as one of the greatest of all time, Casablanca.

Top-grossing films (U.S.)
The top ten 1942 released films by box office gross in North America are as follows:

Events
 January 16 – Actress Carole Lombard is killed in a plane crash west of Las Vegas while returning home to Los Angeles from a War Bond tour.
 June 4 – Mrs. Miniver, starring Greer Garson and Walter Pidgeon, opens at Radio City Music Hall in New York, in what will become a record-breaking 10-week run. The film becomes MGM's highest-grossing film of the 1940s. At the 15th Academy Awards, Mrs. Miniver wins six awards, including Best Picture, Best Director (for William Wyler), Best Actress (for Greer Garson) and Best Supporting Actress (for Teresa Wright).
 August 8 – Walt Disney's animated film Bambi opens in United Kingdom. 
 November 11 – Road to Morocco, starring Bob Hope, Bing Crosby, and Dorothy Lamour, premieres.
 November 26 – The film Casablanca premieres at the Hollywood Theatre in New York City. Released nationally in the United States on January 23, 1943, it becomes one of the top-grossing pictures of 1943 and goes on to win the Best Picture and Best Director awards at the 16th Academy Awards.

Academy Awards

Best Picture: Mrs. Miniver – Metro-Goldwyn-Mayer
Best Director: William Wyler – Mrs. Miniver
Best Actor: James Cagney – Yankee Doodle Dandy
Best Actress: Greer Garson – Mrs. Miniver
Best Supporting Actor: Van Heflin – Johnny Eager
Best Supporting Actress: Teresa Wright – Mrs. Miniver
 Special Academy Award: In Which We Serve

1942 film releases
U.S.A unless stated

January–March
January 1942
1 January
The Man Who Came to Dinner
6 January
Blue, White and Perfect
8 January
The Black Sheep of Whitehall (GB)
10 January
All Through the Night
18 January
Babes on Broadway
19 January
The Big Blockade
23 January
O Pátio das Cantigas (Portugal)
24 January
The Fleet's In
29 January
Son of Fury: The Story of Benjamin Blake
February 1942
2 February
Kings Row
6 February
Valley of the Sun
16 February
The Man Who Wanted to Kill Himself (Spain)
19 February
To Be or Not to Be
Woman of the Year
20 February
Ride 'Em Cowboy
Roxie Hart
21 February
Captains of the Clouds
March 1942
3 March
The Great King (Germany)
7 March
Bullet Scars
10 March
Un Garibaldino al Convento (Italy)
11 March
Rio Rita
13 March
The Ghost of Frankenstein
Song of the Islands
18 March
Reap the Wild Wind
20 March
Rings on Her Fingers
21 March
This Was Paris (GB)
27 March
The Affairs of Jimmy Valentine

April–June
April 1942
1 April
There Was a Father (Japan)
2 April
Alias Boston Blackie
My Favorite Blonde
3 April
Jungle Book
4 April
The Male Animal
19 April
Hatter's Castle (GB)
22 April
Saboteur
24 April
Larceny, Inc.
29 April
The Great Man's Lady
30 April
My Gal Sal
May 1942
8 May
The Corpse Vanishes
In This Our Life
The Spoilers
12 May
This Above All
13 May
This Gun for Hire
21 May
Pacific Rendezvous
Tortilla Flat
22 May
Syncopation
29 May
The Falcon Takes Over
Miss Annie Rooney
Yankee Doodle Dandy
31 May
In Old California
June 1942
13 June
The Big Shot
Flying Fortress (GB)
Tombstone, the Town Too Tough to Die
15 June
The Next of Kin (GB)
16 June
Eagle Squadron
22 June
The Foreman Went to France(GB)
26 June
Ten Gentlemen from West Point
There's One Born Every Minute
27 June
One of Our Aircraft is Missing

July–September
July 1942
2 July
Sons of the Pioneers
8 July
The Murderer Lives at Number 21 (France)
9 July
I Married an Angel
10 July
The Magnificent Ambersons
16 July
Her Cardboard Lover
22 July
Mrs. Miniver
29 July
The Kids Grow Up (Argentina)
31 July
Invisible Agent
August 1942
4 August
Holiday Inn
5 August
Tales of Manhattan
7 August
A-Haunting We Will Go
Pardon My Sarong
10 August
Alibi (GB)
18 August
Pride of the Yankees
20 August
The Talk of the Town
21 August
Bambi
The Pied Piper
24 August
Uncensored (GB)
25 August
Attack on Baku (Germany)
27 August
Somewhere I'll Find You
28 August
The Loves of Edgar Allan Poe
31 August
A Pistol Shot
September 1942
A Yank at Eton
4 September
Across the Pacific
The Big Street
14 September
The First of the Few (GB)
15 September
Ala-Arriba! (Portugal)
16 September
The Major and the Minor
17 September
In Which We Serve (GB)
18 September
Kokoda Front Line! (Australia)
Sherlock Holmes and the Voice of Terror
21 September
The Young Mr. Pitt (GB)
23 September
Wake Island
25 September
Desperate Journey

October–December
October 1942
8 October
Flying Tigers
16 October
Eyes in the Night
23 October
The Glass Key
The Mummy's Tomb
24 October
Northwest Rangers
30 October
I Married a Witch
31 October
Now, Voyager
November 1942
6 November
Springtime in the Rockies
Who Done It?
9 November
The Great Mr. Handel (GB)
10 November
Road to Morocco
19 November
You Were Never Lovelier
20 November
The Gaucho War (Argentina)
'Neath Brooklyn Bridge
25 November
Gentleman Jim
26 November
For Me and My Gal
27 November
The Undying Monster
28 November
George Washington Slept Here
December 1942
4 December
The Black Swan
Thunder Rock (GB)
5 December
Whom the Gods Love (Germany-Austria)
6 December
Cat People
7 December
Went the Day Well? (GB)
9 December
Johnny Eager
11 December
American Empire
Pittsburgh
17 December
Random Harvest
18 December
Aniki-Bóbó (Portugal)
The Great Impersonation
23 December
Four Steps in the Clouds (Italy)
24 December
Time to Kill 
25 December
Arabian Nights
Reunion in France
30 December
Commandos Strike at Dawn

Notable films released in 1942
U.S.A unless stated

A
Across the Pacific, starring Humphrey Bogart and Mary Astor
The Affairs of Jimmy Valentine, starring Dennis O'Keefe and Ruth Terry
A-Haunting We Will Go, starring Laurel and Hardy
Ala-Arriba! – (Portugal)
Alias Boston Blackie, Starring Chester Morris, Adele Mara, and Richard Lane
Alibi, starring Margaret Lockwood and James Mason – (GB)
All Through the Night, starring Humphrey Bogart
American Empire, starring Richard Dix
Andy Hardy's Double Life, starring Lewis Stone, Mickey Rooney, Cecilia Parker, Fay Holden
Aniki-Bóbó – (Portugal)
Arabian Nights, starring Sabu, Jon Hall, Maria Montez
Attack on Baku, starring Willy Fritsch, René Deltgen (Germany)

B
El Baisano Jalil – (Mexico)
Bambi, directed by David Hand, starring Bobby Stewart, Donnie Dunagan, Hardie Albright and John Sutherland
Basant, directed by Amiya Chakravorty and starring Madhubala and Mumtaz Shanti – (India)
The Battle of Midway, documentary directed by John Ford
The Big Blockade, starring Leslie Banks, Michael Redgrave and Will Hay – (UK)
The Big Shot, starring Humphrey Bogart
The Big Street, starring Henry Fonda and Lucille Ball
The Black Sheep of Whitehall, starring Will Hay and John Mills – (GB)
The Black Swan, starring Tyrone Power
Blue, White and Perfect, starring Lloyd Nolan
Bullet Scars, starring Regis Toomey

C
Captains of the Clouds, starring James Cagney
Casablanca, directed by Michael Curtiz (Oscar winner), starring Humphrey Bogart, Ingrid Bergman, Paul Henreid, Peter Lorre, Claude Rains
Cat People, starring Simone Simon and Tom Conway
Commandos Strike at Dawn, starring Paul Muni
The Corpse Vanishes, starring Bela Lugosi
The Courtship of Andy Hardy, starring Lewis Stone, Mickey Rooney, Cecilia Parker, Fay Holden

D
Derailed (Afsporet) – (Denmark)
Desperate Journey, starring Errol Flynn and Ronald Reagan
The Devil's Envoys (Les Visiteurs du Soir), directed by Marcel Carné, starring Arletty – (France)

E
Eagle Squadron, directed by Arthur Lubin 
Escape from Hong Kong, starring Marjorie Lord
Eyes in the Night, directed by Fred Zinneman, starring Edward Arnold, Ann Harding, Donna Reed

F
The Falcon Takes Over, starring George Sanders
The First of the Few, directed by Leslie Howard, starring Howard and David Niven – (GB)
The Fleet's In, starring Dorothy Lamour and William Holden
Flying Fortress, starring Richard Greene (GB)
Flying Tigers, starring John Wayne
The Foreman Went to France, starring Clifford Evans and Tommy Trinder – (GB)
For Me and My Gal, starring Judy Garland and Gene Kelly
Four Steps in the Clouds (Quattro passi fra le nuvole) – (Italy)

G
Un Garibaldino al Convento, directed by Vittorio De Sica – (Italy)
The Gaucho War (La guerra gaucha) – (Argentina)
Gentleman Jim, a biopic of boxer James J. Corbett, starring Errol Flynn
George Washington Slept Here, starring Jack Benny
The Ghost of Frankenstein starring Lon Chaney Jr.
The Glass Key, starring Alan Ladd and Veronica Lake
The Goose Steps Out, starring Will Hay – (GB)
The Great Impersonation, directed by John Rawlins, starring Ralph Bellamy
The Great King (Der große König) – (Germany)
The Great Man's Lady, directed by William A. Wellman, and starring Barbara Stanwyck
The Great Mr. Handel, directed by Norman Walker, starring Wilfrid Lawson (GB)

H
Hatter's Castle, starring Robert Newton, Deborah Kerr, James Mason – (GB)
Her Cardboard Lover, starring Robert Taylor and Norma Shearer
Holiday Inn, starring Bing Crosby and Fred Astaire
Historia de un gran amor (A Great Love Story) – (Mexico)

I
I Married an Angel, starring Nelson Eddy and Jeanette MacDonald
I Married a Witch, starring Veronica Lake and Fredric March
Ibn El-balad, directed by Stephan Rosti, starring Mahmoud Zulfikar and Aziza Amir – (Egypt)
In Old California, starring John Wayne
In This Our Life, starring Bette Davis and Olivia de Havilland
In Which We Serve, directed by David Lean and Noël Coward, starring Coward and John Mills – (GB)
Invisible Agent, starring Jon Hall

J
Jackass Mail, starring Wallace Beery and Marjorie Main
Johnny Eager, starring Robert Taylor and Lana Turner
Jungle Book, directed by Zoltan Korda, starring Sabu

K
Kid Glove Killer, the directorial debut of Fred Zinnemann
The Kids Grow Up (Los Chicos crecen) – (Argentina)
Kings Row, starring Ann Sheridan, Ronald Reagan, Claude Rains
Kokoda Front Line!, an Academy Award winning documentary film – (Australia)

L
Larceny, Inc., starring Edward G. Robinson, Jane Wyman, Broderick Crawford
Listen to Britain, propaganda film directed by Humphrey Jennings – (GB)
The Loves of Edgar Allan Poe, starring Linda Darnell

M
The Magnificent Ambersons, directed by Orson Welles, starring Joseph Cotten and Dolores Costello
The Major and the Minor, directed by Billy Wilder, starring Ginger Rogers and Ray Milland
The Male Animal, starring Henry Fonda and Olivia de Havilland
The Man Who Came to Dinner, starring Bette Davis, Monty Woolley, Jimmy Durante
The Man Who Wanted to Kill Himself (El hombre que se quiso matar) – (Spain)
Miss Annie Rooney, starring Shirley Temple
Moontide, starring Jean Gabin and Ida Lupino
Mrs. Miniver, directed by William Wyler, starring Greer Garson and Walter Pidgeon
The Mummy's Tomb, starring Lon Chaney Jr.
The Murderer Lives at Number 21 (L'Assassin habite au 21), directed by Henri-Georges Clouzot, starring Pierre Fresnay – (France)
My Favorite Blonde, starring Bob Hope and Madeleine Carroll
My Gal Sal, starring Rita Hayworth
My Sister Eileen, starring Rosalind Russell

N
'Neath Brooklyn Bridge, starring The East Side Kids
The Next of Kin, starring Mervyn Johns – (GB)
Northwest Rangers
Now, Voyager, starring Bette Davis and Paul Henreid

O
One of Our Aircraft is Missing, directed by Michael Powell and Emeric Pressburger – (GB)
Overland Mail, starring Lon Chaney, Jr., Noah Beery, Jr., Noah Beery, Sr.

P
Pacific Rendezvous, starring Lee Bowman
The Palm Beach Story, directed by Preston Sturges, starring Claudette Colbert, Joel McCrea, Rudy Vallée
Panama Hattie, starring Ann Sothern and Lena Horne
Pardon My Sarong, starring Bud Abbott and Lou Costello
O Pátio das Cantigas (The Courtyard of Songs) – (Portugal)
People of the Mountains, directed by István Szőts – (Hungary)
The Pied Piper, starring Monty Woolley and Roddy McDowall
A Pistol Shot, starring Assia Noris, Fosco Giachetti (Italy)
Pittsburgh, starring John Wayne, Marlene Dietrich, Randolph Scott, Shemp Howard
The Pride of the Yankees, starring Gary Cooper, Teresa Wright, Walter Brennan, Babe Ruth

R
Random Harvest, starring Ronald Colman and Greer Garson
Reap the Wild Wind, starring John Wayne, Paulette Goddard, Ray Milland
Reunion in France, starring Joan Crawford
Ride 'Em Cowboy, starring Abbott and Costello
Rings on Her Fingers, starring Henry Fonda and Gene Tierney
Rio Rita, starring Bud Abbott and Lou Costello
Road to Morocco, starring Bing Crosby, Dorothy Lamour, Bob Hope
The Rock of the Souls (El Peñón de las Ánimas) – (Mexico)
Roti (Bread) – (India)
Roxie Hart, starring Ginger Rogers

S
Saboteur, directed by Alfred Hitchcock, starring Priscilla Lane and Robert Cummings
Saludos Amigos, a Walt Disney animated film starring Donald Duck and Goofy (released in South America in 1942 and in the U.S. in 1943)
 Sherlock Holmes and the Secret Weapon - directed by Roy William Neill, starring Basil Rathbone as Holmes and Nigel Bruce as Watson, co-starring Lionel Atwill as Moriarty
 Sherlock Holmes and the Voice of Terror - directed by John Rawlins, starring Basil Rathbone as Holmes and Nigel Bruce as Watson, also featuring Evelyn Ankers and Henry Daniell
Somewhere I'll Find You, starring Clark Gable and Lana Turner
Son of Fury: The Story of Benjamin Blake, starring Tyrone Power and Gene Tierney
Song of the Islands, a Darryl F. Zanuck production starring Betty Grable and Victor Mature
Sons of the Pioneers, starring Roy Rogers and George 'Gabby' Hayes
The Spoilers, starring Marlene Dietrich and John Wayne
Springtime in the Rockies, starring Betty Grable, John Payne, Carmen Miranda and Cesar Romero
Star Spangled Rhythm, featuring an all-star cast
Sweater Girl, starring Eddie Bracken, June Preisser, and Betty Jane Rhodes
Syncopation, starring Adolphe Menjou

T
Tales of Manhattan, directed by Julien Duvivier with an all-star cast
The Talk of the Town, starring Cary Grant, Jean Arthur, Ronald Colman
Tarzan's New York Adventure, starring Johnny Weissmuller
Ten Gentlemen from West Point, starring George Montgomery and Maureen O'Hara
Tennessee Johnson, starring Van Heflin and Ruth Hussey
There Was a Father (chichi ariki), directed by Yasujirō Ozu (Japan)
There's One Born Every Minute, starring Hugh Herbert and Peggy Moran
This Above All, starring Tyrone Power
This Gun for Hire, starring Veronica Lake and Alan Ladd
This Was Paris, starring Ann Dvorak – (GB)
Time to Kill, starring Lloyd Nolan
Thunder Rock, starring Michael Redgrave and James Mason – (GB)
To Be or Not to Be, directed by Ernst Lubitsch, starring Jack Benny and (in her last film) Carole Lombard
Tombstone, the Town Too Tough to Die, starring Richard Dix
Tortilla Flat, starring Spencer Tracy, Hedy Lamarr, John Garfield

U
Uncensored, directed by Anthony Asquith – (GB)
The Undying Monster, starring James Ellison

V
Valentin the Good (Valentin Dobrotivý), directed by Martin Frič – (Czechoslovakia)
Valley of the Sun, starring Lucille Ball and James Craig

W
Wake Island, starring Brian Donlevy and Robert Preston
Went the Day Well?, directed by Cavalcanti, starring Leslie Banks and Mervyn Johns – (GB)
Who Done It?, starring Bud Abbott and Lou Costello
Whom the Gods Love, directed by Karl Hartl (Germany-Austria)
Woman of the Year, starring Spencer Tracy and Katharine Hepburn

Y
A Yank at Eton, starring Mickey Rooney
Yankee Doodle Dandy, starring James Cagney
The Young Mr. Pitt, directed by Carol Reed, starring Robert Donat – biopic of William Pitt the Younger – (GB)
You Were Never Lovelier, starring Fred Astaire and Rita Hayworth

Serials
Captain Midnight, starring Dave O'Brien, directed by James W. Horne
Don Winslow of the Navy
Gang Busters
Junior G-Men of the Air, starring the Dead End Kids
King of the Mounties, starring Allan Lane, directed by William Witney
Overland Mail
Perils of Nyoka, starring Kay Aldridge & Clayton Moore, directed by William Witney
Perils of the Royal Mounted, directed by James W. Horne
The Secret Code, directed by Spencer Gordon Bennet
Spy Smasher, starring Kane Richmond, directed by William Witney
The Valley of Vanishing Men, directed by Spencer Gordon Bennet

Short film series
Laurel and Hardy (1921–1943)
Our Gang (1922–1944)
The Three Stooges (1934–1959)

Animated short film series
Mickey Mouse (1928–1953)
Looney Tunes (1930–1969)
Terrytoons (1930–1964)
Merrie Melodies (1931–1969)
Scrappy (1931–1941)
Popeye (1933–1957)
Color Rhapsodies (1934–1949)
Donald Duck (1937–1956)
Pluto (1937–1951)
Walter Lantz Cartune (also known as New Universal Cartoons or Cartune Comedies) (1938-1942)
Goofy (1939–1955)
Andy Panda (1939–1949)
Tom and Jerry (1940–1958)
Woody Woodpecker (1941–1949)
Swing Symphonies (1941–1945)
The Fox and the Crow (1941–1950)

Births
January 3 – John Thaw, English actor (d. 2002)
January 7 - Danny Steinmann, American director (d. 2012)
January 8 – Yvette Mimieux, American actress (d. 2022)
January 10 – Walter Hill, American director, producer and screenwriter
January 11 - Joel Zwick, American director
January 19 – Michael Crawford, English actor and singer
January 21 - Michael G. Wilson, American-British screenwriter and producer
January 27 - John Witherspoon (actor), American actor and comedian (d. 2019)
January 29 - Claudine Longet, Franco-American actress and singer
January 31 – Daniela Bianchi, Italian actress 
February 1
Bibi Besch, Austrian-American actress (d. 1996)
Terry Jones, Welsh comedic actor, director and screenwriter (d. 2020)
February 8 – Robert Klein, American actor and comedian
February 9
Marianna Hill, American actress
Ada Lundver, Estonian actress and singer (d. 2011)
February 13 - Carol Lynley, American actress, child model (died 2019)
February 14 - Andrew Robinson, American character actor
February 21 – Margarethe von Trotta, German director
March 9 - Ralph Peduto, American actor, playwright, writer and director (died 2014)
March 15 - Molly Peters, English actress and model (died 2017)
March 25 – Richard O'Brien, English actor and writer
March 27 
Art Evans (actor), American actor
Michael York, English actor
March 28 – Mike Newell, English director and producer
March 30 - Kenneth Welsh, Canadian actor (died 2022)
April 2 - Roshan Seth, British-Indian actor, writer and director
April 3 – Marsha Mason, American actress
April 6 – Barry Levinson, American director, producer and screenwriter
April 11 - Matthew Walker (Canadian actor), English-Canadian actor
April 17 - David Bradley, English actor
April 23 – Sandra Dee, American actress (d. 2005)
April 24 – Barbra Streisand, American actress, singer, director and producer
April 27 - John Shrapnel, English actor (d. 2020)
May 19 - Flemming Quist Møller, Danish director, cartoonist, screenwriter and actor (d. 2022)
May 29 - Kevin Conway (actor), American actor and director (d. 2020)
June 7 - Elizabeth Counsell, English actress
June 18 
Roger Ebert, American film critic of the Chicago Sun Times (d. 2013)
Paul McCartney, English musician and composer (The Beatles)
June 29 - Tony Vogel, English actor (d. 2015)
July 1 – Geneviève Bujold, Canadian actress
July 9 – Richard Roundtree, American actor
July 10 - Tam White, Scottish musician and actor (d. 2010)
July 13 – Harrison Ford, American actor and producer
July 22 - Anthony James (actor), American character actor (d. 2020)
July 23 - Allen Danziger, American former actor
July 24 – Chris Sarandon, American actor
July 29 - Tony Sirico, American actor (d. 2022)
August 1 - Giancarlo Giannini, Italian actor, director and screenwriter
August 4 - Don S. Davis, American character actor (d. 2008)
August 7 – Tobin Bell, actor
August 18 - Lauro António, Portuguese director (d. 2022)
August 19 - Fred Thompson, American politician, attorney, actor and radio personality (d. 2015)
August 28 - Peter Bartlett, American actor and voice actor
August 29 - Gottfried John, German actor (d. 2014)
September 5 - Werner Herzog, German director, screenwriter and actor
September 6 - Carol Wayne, American actress (d. 1985)
September 11 - Patricia Franklin, English actress
September 17 - Lupe Ontiveros, American actress (d. 2012)
September 19 - Victor Brandt, American actor
September 24 - Kenneth Tigar, American actor
September 25 - Robyn Nevin, Australian actress and director
September 26 - Kent McCord, American actor
September 28 - Marshall Bell, American character actor
September 29 
Madeline Kahn, American actress (d. 1999)
Ian McShane, English actor
October 3 - Steve Susskind, American actor (d. 2005)
October 4 – Christopher Stone, American actor (d. 1995)
October 6 – Britt Ekland, Swedish actress
October 7 - Melinda O. Fee, American actress (d. 2020)
October 11 – Amitabh Bachchan, Indian actor
October 13 – Suzzanna, Indonesian actress (d. 2008)
October 20 - Robert Costanzo, American actor
October 22 – Annette Funicello, American actress and singer (d. 2013)
October 25 - Orso Maria Guerrini, Italian actor
October 26 
Bob Hoskins, English actor and director (d. 2014)
Eili Sild, Estonian actress 
October 28 - Terence Donovan (actor), English-Australian actor
October 31 – David Ogden Stiers, American actor (d. 2018)
November 1
Marcia Wallace, American actress and comedian (d. 2013)
Michael Zaslow, American actor (d. 1998)
November 15 – Hans Kaldoja, Estonian actor (d. 2017)
November 17 – Martin Scorsese, American director, producer, screenwriter and actor
November 21 - Michael Cavanaugh, American actor
November 24 – Billy Connolly, Scottish comedian and actor
December 3 - Lynn Farleigh, English actress
December 4 – Gemma Jones, English actress
December 12 - Fatma Girik, Turkish actress (d. 2022)
December 14 - Juan Diego, Spanish actor (d. 2022)
December 27 - Charmian Carr, American actress and singer (d. 2016)
December 30 - Fred Ward, American actor and producer (d. 2022)

Deaths
January 16 – Carole Lombard, 33, American actress, To Be or Not to Be, My Man Godfrey, Made for Each Other, Nothing Sacred
January 31 – Rolf Wenkhaus, 24, German actor, Emil and the Detectives, S.A.-Mann Brand
April 10 – Carl Schenstrøm, 60, Danish actor, Cocktails, The Last Laugh
May 19 – Hale Hamilton, 62, American actor, writer, director, The Great Lover, Love Affair, Parole Girl, The Girl from Missouri
May 29 – John Barrymore, 60, American actor, Grand Hotel, Twentieth Century, Dr. Jekyll and Mr. Hyde, Dinner at Eight
June 4 – Virginia Lee Corbin, 31, American actress, Hands Up!, X Marks the Spot
July 5 – Karin Swanström, 69, Swedish actress, director, His English Wife, Black Roses
August 12 – Phillips Holmes, 35, American actor, Night Court, Men Must Fight
August 18 – Rafaela Ottiano, 54, Italian-born American actress, Grand Hotel, She Done Him Wrong, The Devil-Doll, Curly Top
October 20 – May Robson, 84, Australian-born American stage & film actress, Bringing Up Baby, A Star is Born, Lady for a Day, The Adventures of Tom Sawyer
October 22 – Olga Svendsen, 59, Danish actress, Kidnapped
October 24 – James C. Morton, 58, American actor, Public Cowboy No. 1, Lucky Legs
November 5 – George M. Cohan, 64, American actor, songwriter, entertainer, The Phantom President, Broadway Jones, subject of Yankee Doodle Dandy
November 9 – Edna May Oliver, 59, American stage & film actress, David Copperfield, Drums Along the Mohawk, Little Women, A Tale of Two Cities
November 12 – Laura Hope Crews, 62, American stage & screen actress, Gone with the Wind, Camille, Angel, The Blue Bird
November 15 – Sidney Fox, 30, American actress, Murders in the Rue Morgue, Bad Sister, Six Cylinder Love
December 12 – Helen Westley, 67, American stage & screen actress, Heidi, Roberta, All This, and Heaven Too, Alexander's Ragtime Band

Film debuts 
Richard Attenborough – In Which We Serve
Madhubala – Basant
Mumtaz Shanti – Basant
Betty Hutton – The Fleet's In
Anne Jeffreys – Billy the Kid Trapped
Gene Kelly – For Me and My Gal
Ricardo Montalbán – The Three Musketeers
Harry Morgan – To the Shores of Tripoli
Eleanor Parker – The Big Shot
Simone Signoret – Bolero
Elizabeth Taylor – There's One Born Every Minute
Peter Ustinov – One of Our Aircraft Is Missing
Esther Williams – Andy Hardy's Double Life
Tweety Bird – A Tale of Two Kitties

References 

 
Film by year